Gezienus (or Gesinus) ten Doesschate (11 August 1885, Zwolle – 9 March 1965, Utrecht) was a Dutch ophthalmologist, amateur painter and historian.

He was active as an amateur painter in Utrecht under the pseudonym Thomas Denier. In 1916 he was briefly a member of de Anderen, a Dutch artists' group that included Theo van Doesburg, but dropped out in support of de Winter, another artists group.

At the end of his life he contributed to a number of medical-historical books concerning the University of Utrecht.

His son was Jurriaan ten Doesschate (1912–1977), ophthalmologist and medical scientist

References

1885 births
1964 deaths
Dutch ophthalmologists
Utrecht University alumni
People from Zwolle
20th-century Dutch painters
Dutch male painters
20th-century Dutch male artists